Ninjatitan (meaning "Ninja giant") is a genus of titanosaur sauropod dinosaur from the Early Cretaceous (Berriasian-Valanginian)-aged Bajada Colorada Formation of Argentina. It is the oldest titanosaur known to date and the type species N. zapatai was named and described in 2021. Its generic name comes from a nickname of Argentine palaeontologist Sebastian Apesteguia, and the specific name comes from technician Rogelio Zapata. It is known from postcranial remains discovered in 2014.

Classification 
Ninjatitan does not preserve any unanimous features that classify it as a somphospondylan, but it does bear features that suggest it can be included within the clade Titanosauria, either as a basal taxon or possibly within the clade Colossosauria. The phylogenetic results of Gallina and colleagues are shown below, where Ninjatitan was suggested to have multiple possible positions.

References 

Fossil taxa described in 2021
Taxa described in 2021
Sauropods
Titanosaurs
Berriasian first appearances
Valanginian genera
Berriasian genus first appearances